Winslow Martin Zephyr (1 March 1931 – 10 June 2009) was a Guyanese politician and lawyer. He served as Deputy Speaker of the National Assembly from 1998 to 2000. After the death of Derek Jagan, Zephyr was elected Speaker of the National Assembly of Guyana and served until 2001 He died in the United States on 10 June 2009.

References

20th-century Guyanese lawyers
Speakers of the National Assembly (Guyana)
People's Progressive Party (Guyana) politicians
1931 births
2009 deaths